The Twin Falls Cowboys were a Class C minor league baseball team from 1939 to 1942 and 1946 to 1951 in the Pioneer League. Their affiliation was with the Seattle Rainiers in 1939, and later the New York Yankees from 1946 to 1951. The Cowboys played at Jaycee Field in Twin Falls, Idaho, located in the northeast corner of the city's Harmon Park.

History

The Cowboys' home ballpark was constructed during the spring of 1939, as a WPA project costing $30,000. The team's first Pioneer League game was played on May 2, 1939, when they lost an away game to the Pocatello Cardinals by a score of 17–1. The Cowboy's first home game in Twin Falls was played on May 5, when the Cowboys again lost to the Cardinals, 6–3.

Statistics for the team between the 1939 and 1949 seasons are incomplete; also, the league did not operate from 1943 to 1945 due to World War II. Records do show that the Cowboys were the Pioneer League champions three times; 1939, 1947, and 1948.

The Cowboys were second in the Pioneer League in 1950, posting a 76–50 record under manager Wally Berger. Ray Posipanka hit 32 home runs for the Cowboys, leading the team; Svend Jessen contributed 25 more home runs en route to posting a league leading 141 team home runs during the 136 game season.

Second baseman Don Trower took over as manager in the 1951 season, in which the Cowboys went 71–68. Conway, 19, was in his first season of professional baseball and leading the Pioneer League in home runs (12) at the time of his death. He was killed during a pre-game warm-up in Ogden, Utah, on June 29, 1951, when he was struck over the heart by a throw from Trower while distracted; he died within minutes of the impact.

In 1952, the Magic Valley Cowboys became Twin Falls' team in the Pioneer League; meanwhile the Boise Yankees became New York's minor league affiliate in the Pioneer League.

Season records

 The league did not hold playoffs in 1939; the Cowboys became champions by finishing first in league standings.

All-stars

Notable players
Woodie Held
Jack Lohrke
Gil McDougald
Charlie Metro
Gus Triandos

See also
Twin Falls Cowboys players

References

Further reading

External links
Harmon Park page from city of Twin Falls

Defunct Pioneer League (baseball) teams
Baseball teams established in 1939
Professional baseball teams in Idaho
New York Yankees minor league affiliates
1939 establishments in Idaho
1951 disestablishments in Idaho
Sports clubs disestablished in 1951
Defunct baseball teams in Idaho
Baseball teams disestablished in 1951